The white-gaped honeyeater (Stomiopera unicolor) is a species of bird in the family Meliphagidae.
It is endemic to Australia.

Its natural habitats are subtropical or tropical moist lowland forests and subtropical or tropical mangrove forests.

The white-gaped honeyeater was previously placed in the genus Lichenostomus, but was moved to Stomiopera after a molecular phylogenetic analysis published in 2011 showed that the original genus was polyphyletic.

References 

white-naped honeyeater
Birds of the Northern Territory
Birds of Cape York Peninsula
Birds of Queensland
Endemic birds of Australia
white-naped honeyeater
Taxonomy articles created by Polbot